Ageing Research Reviews is a peer-reviewed scientific journal publishing review articles covering research on ageing, aging-associated diseases, and human life expectancy. The editor-in-chief is Claudio Franceschi (University of Bologna).

Abstracting and indexing 
The journal is abstracted and indexed in:
BIOSIS
Chemical Abstracts
Current Contents/Life Sciences
Embase
FRANCIS
MEDLINE/PubMed
PASCAL
Scopus
According to the Journal Citation Reports, its 2020 impact factor is 10.895.

References

External links 
 

English-language journals
Elsevier academic journals
Gerontology journals
Publications established in 2002